Michele Gazzoli (born 4 March 1999) is an Italian cyclist, who is currently suspended for the unintentional use of a banned substance. Before his ban Gazzoli rode for UCI WorldTeam .

Major results

2016
 1st Stage 2 
 2nd La Piccola Sanremo
 3rd Ronde van Vlaanderen Juniores
 9th Gent-Wevelgem Juniors
2017
 1st  Road race, UEC European Junior Road Championships
 UEC European Junior Track Championships
1st  Elimination race
3rd  Scratch
 1st  Overall 
1st  Points classification
1st Stage 1
 2nd Ronde van Vlaanderen Juniores
 3rd  Road race, UCI Junior Road World Championships
 8th La Piccola Sanremo
 9th Gent-Wevelgem Juniors
2019
 3rd L'Etoile d'Or
 9th Road race, UEC European Under-23 Road Championships
2020
 1st 
 10th Road race, UEC European Under-23 Road Championships
2021
 1st Gran Premio della Liberazione
 1st Gran Premio Città di Empoli
 4th Road race, UCI Road World Under–23 Championships
 8th Trofej Umag

References

External links

1999 births
Living people
Italian male cyclists
Cyclists from the Province of Brescia